The name Freddy has been used for two tropical cyclones in the Australian region of the Southern Hemisphere. The more recent of the two crossed into the South-West Indian Ocean region.

Cyclone Freddy (2009) – Category 1 tropical cyclone that caused heavy rainfall in Indonesia, killing two
Cyclone Freddy (2023) – Category 5 tropical cyclone which became the longest-lived tropical cyclone on record and severely affected Malawi, Mozambique and Madagascar, causing at least 580 deaths

See also
 Tropical Storm Fred, a similar name used in the Atlantic Ocean, Western Pacific Ocean, and in the Australian region
 List of storms named Freda, a similar name used in the Western Pacific Ocean and the Southern Hemisphere

Australian region cyclone set index articles